Miguel Gil Moreno de Mora (June 21, 1967 – May 24, 2000) was a Spanish cameraman and war correspondent, working for Associated Press.

After a successful career as a corporate lawyer in Barcelona, Spain, Miguel became a freelance war correspondent first in Sarajevo and later, an award winning cameraman for AP Television.

Leaving behind his career as a corporate lawyer in Spain, Miguel became a freelance war correspondent in Sarajevo and later in Kosovo, where he was one of the few Western cameraman to stay in Pristina during the Nato air campaign. His images of Albanians being herded on to railway carriages changed our understanding of what was happening in Kosovo.

After that, he went to Grozny (Chechnya). His pictures from Chechnya were the people of Grozny's only window to the world. He also was in Congo, Liberia, Rwanda, Sudan and Sierra Leone. However, as he wrote himself, he experienced the most dangerous moments of his life in Chechnya. Miguel's images were some of the few informative documents registered by an international agency in that conflict.

Miguel was awarded as cameraman of the year by the Royal Television Society in 2000, recognizing its outstanding job in conflict areas.

Miguel Gil Moreno de Mora and Reuters Correspondent Kurt Schork were shot to death in an ambush to a Sierra Leone Army (SLA) convoy by the fighters of the Revolutionary United Front on May 24, 2000. In the attack  four SLA soldiers were killed and two other journalists, South African cameraman Mark Chisholm and Greek photographer Yannis Behrakis, were injured.

Miguel, 32, was "a big man — big of heart," in the words of AP photographer Santiago Lyon.

References

External links
 Miguel Gil Moreno Foundation
 Miguel Gil Moreno Memorial

Associated Press reporters
Journalists killed while covering the Sierra Leone Civil War
Spanish war correspondents
1967 births
2000 deaths
Deaths by firearm in Sierra Leone
20th-century American non-fiction writers
20th-century Spanish journalists